Diopecephalus is a genus of pterodactyloid pterosaur from the Lower Tithonian (Upper Jurassic) of the Lithographic Limestone, Bavaria, Germany. The type and only species is D. kochi, although the name has been applied to Pterodactylus longicollum, with longicollum erroneously listed as the type species.

Assigned species
Like many pterosaurs, it has had a confusing taxonomic history, being given names by various authorities which identify it with four other genera:

Pterodactylus longicollum (von Meyer 1854)
Pterodactylus vulturinus (Wagner 1857)
Pterodactylus longicollis (Wagner 1858)
Pterodactylus suevicus (Fraas 1878)
Cycnorhamphus fraasii (Seeley 1891)
Pterodactylus frassi (Seeley 1901)
Gallodactylus longicollum (Fabre 1974)
Ornithocephalus longipes (Olshevsky 1978) (Ornithocephalus is an obsolete name for Pterodactylus)
Ornithocephalus vulturinus (Olshevsky 1978)

In 2017, Steven U. Vidovic and David M. Martill resurrected the genus Diopecephalus for Pterodactylus kochi, a taxon generally regarded as synonymous with Pterodactylus antiquus. Though historically considered distinct from antiquus, most modern analyses of kochi anatomy strongly suggest it represents a juvenile P. antiquus. Pterosaur expert Christopher Bennett noted that some allegedly diagnostic kochi anatomy actually reflected measurement errors of the kochi holotype, and that once corrected the two species cannot be adequately distinguished from one another. Vidovic and Martill's suggestion that kochi is taxonomically distinct rely on a combination of characteristics rather than autapomorphies, including features such as the slope of the snout and the rounded shape of the back of the skull, the shape and distribution of teeth, and the length and depth of the cervical vertebrae. Most of these features are typical for Pterodactylus or are known to vary with growth stage and, as per Vidovic and Martill's previous work with another resurrected Pterodactylus-like genus, Aerodactylus, arguments discounting individual variation and preservational factors (e.g., specimen orientation, compression) from true taxonomic distinction were not provided. Further work is likely needed to validate D. kochi as a genuine taxon, and not a synonym of P. antiquus.

Classification
Below is a cladogram showing the results of a phylogenetic analysis presented by Andres, Clark & Xu, 2014. In the analysis, they identified Diopecephalus as Pterodactylus kochi, and sister taxon of Pterodactylus antiquus within the clade Euctenochasmatia.

References

von Meyer, C. E. H. 1854, Letter on various fossils. N. Jb. Miner. Geogn. Geol. Petrefakt. pp. 47–58.
Wagner, J. A. 1857, Beiträge zur Kenntnis der Flugsaurier aus den lithographischen Schiefern in Bayern. Gelehrte Anz. k. bayer. Akad. Wiss. (2), 171–181.
Seeley, H. G. 1871, Additional evidence of the structure of the head in ornithosaurs from the Cambridge Upper Greensand; being a supplement to “The Ornithosauria”. Ann. Mag. nat. Hist.(7) 37, 20–36. & pls 2–3.
Seeley, H. G. 1891, The ornithosaurian pelvis. Ann. Mag. nat. Hist. (6) 7, 237–255.

External links

The Pterosaur Database 

Taxa named by Harry Seeley
Late Jurassic pterosaurs
Jurassic pterosaurs of Europe
Pterodactyloids